Gainesboro is a town in Jackson County, Tennessee, United States. The population was 920 at the 2020 census. It is the county seat of Jackson County.

Gainesboro is part of the Cookeville, Tennessee Micropolitan Statistical Area.

History

The Gainesboro vicinity was a popular destination for long hunters as early as the 1770s, as natural salt licks drew rich game to the area. In the 1790s, Avery's Trace passed nearby, with travellers along the road lodging at Fort Blount about 10 miles to the west.  Gainesboro was named after General Edmund Pendleton Gaines (1777–1849).  It has been the seat of Jackson County since 1820. The 1970 John Frankenheimer Movie I Walk the Line starring Gregory Peck and featuring Johnny Cash's song I Walk the Line was also filmed in Gainesboro.

Geography

Demographics

2020 census

As of the 2020 United States census, there were 920 people, 347 households, and 152 families residing in the town.

2000 census
As of the census of 2000, there were 879 people, 373 households, and 208 families residing in the town. The population density was 562.5 people per square mile (217.6/km2). There were 430 housing units at an average density of 275.2 per square mile (106.4/km2). The racial makeup of the town was 98.29% White, 1.98% African American, 0.11% Native American, 0.46% Asian, 0.34% from other races, and 0.80% from two or more races. Hispanic or Latino of any race were 0.57% of the population.

There were 373 households, of which 16.9% had children under the age of 18 living with them, 36.2% were married couples living together, 13.9% had a female householder with no husband present, and 44.0% were non-families. 38.6% of all households were made up of individuals, and 18.5% had someone living alone who was 65 years of age or older. The average household size was 2.00 and the average family size was 2.61.

In the town, the population was spread out, with 13.5% under the age of 18, 8.8% from 18 to 24, 20.4% from 25 to 44, 26.6% from 45 to 64, and 30.7% who were 65 years of age or older. The median age was 51 years. For every 100 females, there were 68.7 males. For every 100 females age 18 and over, there were 67.4 males.

The median income for a household in the town was $19,861, and the median income for a family was $30,250. Males had a median income of $24,091 versus $21,932 for females. The per capita income for the town was $17,798. About 20.3% of families and 27.8% of the population were below the poverty line, including 49.0% of those under age 18 and 25.7% of those age 65 or over.

Notable people
 Charlotte Burks, Tennessee State Senator.
 Mounce Gore Butler - member of the United States House of Representatives.
 Alvan Cullem Gillem - Union army general.
 John J. Gore - United States District Court judge
 Jamie Dailey - Bluegrass musician of the music group Dailey & Vincent and member of the Grand Ole Opry.

References

External links

Official County Website
Municipal Technical Advisory Service entry for Gainesboro – information on local government, elections, and link to charter

Towns in Jackson County, Tennessee
Towns in Tennessee
County seats in Tennessee
Cookeville, Tennessee micropolitan area